Saint Julia is the name of:

 Julia of Troyes (died 272), virgin and martyr
 St. Julia (died 303), Iberian-peninsula servant, victim in massacre that included religious leader Engratia
 Julia of Lisbon (died 303), early Christian saint and martyr
 Julia of Corsica (died c. 439), Roman religious leader
 Julie Billiart (1751–1816), French religious leader
 St. Julia (1865–1939), Austrian-born religious leader a.k.a. Ursula Ledóchowska